An Imaginative Man is an 1895 novel by the British writer Robert Hichens. A tale about a young honeymooning man in Cairo who eventually goes mad after a series of sexual adventures and kills himself at the Great Sphinx, it was a commercial hit and Hichens wrote a number of further books in the orientalist style.

References

Bibliography
 Sutherland, John. The Stanford Companion to Victorian Fiction. Stanford University Press, 1990.
 Vinson, James. Twentieth-Century Romance and Gothic Writers. Macmillan, 1982.

1895 British novels
Novels by Robert Hichens 
Novels set in Cairo
Great Sphinx of Giza